Protective tariffs are tariffs that are enacted with the aim of protecting a domestic industry. They aim to make imported goods cost more than equivalent goods produced domestically, thereby causing sales of domestically produced goods to rise, supporting local industry. Tariffs are also imposed in order to raise government revenue, or to reduce an undesirable activity (sin tax). Although a tariff can simultaneously protect domestic industry and earn government revenue, the goals of protection and revenue maximization suggest different tariff rates, entailing a tradeoff between the two aims.

How tariffs work

A tariff is a tax added onto goods imported into a country; protective tariffs are taxes that are intended to increase the cost of an import so it is less competitive against a roughly equivalent domestic good. For example, if similar cloth for sale in America cost $4 in for a version imported from Britain (including additional shipping, etc.) and $4 for a version originating in the United States, the American government may wish to impose a protective tariff to make the price of British cloth higher for Americans. The underlying goal for a protective tariff is to protect the domestic industry from foreign competition.

This political issue relies on the purchasing power parity between the currencies of countries involved, and also with the parallel currency substitution in the domestic countries.

History

United States

Alexander Hamilton was the first American to propose the use of protective tariffs to promote industrialization in his "Report on Manufactures." Hamilton thought that a tariff on textile imports would subsidize American efforts to establish manufacturing facilities to eventually compete with those of the British. Heeding Hamilton's advice, president George Washington signed the Tariff Act of 1790 into law, as America's second piece of legislation. He stated tariffs were necessary for national security reasons:A free people ought not only to be armed, but disciplined; to which end a uniform and well-digested plan is requisite; and their safety and interest require that they should promote such manufactories as tend to render them independent of others for essential, particularly military, supplies.After the War of 1812, cheap British products flooded the American market, which undercut and threatened the infantile industry of the United States. Congress set a tariff in 1816 in order to prevent some of these British goods from entering the United States, followed by another in 1824 and culminating with the controversial Tariff of Abominations in 1828.

President John Quincy Adams approved the Tariff of Abominations after it received a majority vote in the House of Representatives. This 1828 tariff's goal was to protect Northern and Western agricultural products from foreign competition, but in doing so sparked a national debate over the constitutionality of placing tariffs on imports without the intent to merely raise duty revenue. The earmarked items in this case included iron, molasses, distilled spirits, flax, and other finished goods. Opposition to this tariff came predominantly from the South since this region lacked a manufacturing sector, leaving it dependent on the North and foreign trade to supply its manufactures. In addition to artificially elevating import costs, the so-called "Tariff of Abominations" afflicted the South by hampering its cotton trade to England, the region's primary source of income. This 1828 tariff was so unpopular that it played a significant role in the failure of John Quincy Adams' reelection bid in 1828.

Starting in the Civil War, protection was the ideological cement holding the Republican coalition together. High tariffs were used to promise higher sales to business, higher wages to industrial workers, and higher demand for their crops to farmers.  Democrats said it was a tax on the little man.  After 1900 Progressive insurgents said it promoted monopoly. It had greatest support in the Northeast, and greatest opposition in the South and West. The Midwest was the battle ground.   The tariff issue was pulling the GOP apart. Roosevelt tried to postpone the issue, but Taft had to meet it head on in 1909 with the Payne–Aldrich Tariff Act. Eastern conservatives led by Nelson W. Aldrich wanted high tariffs on manufactured goods (especially woolens), while Midwesterners called for low tariffs. Aldrich outmaneuvered them by lowering the tariff on farm products, which outraged the farmers. The great battle over the high Payne–Aldrich Tariff Act in 1910 ripped the Republicans apart and set up the realignment in favor of the Democrats.

The Democrats lowered the tariff in 1913 but the economic dislocations of the First World War made it irrelevant. When the Republicans returned to power in 1921 they again imposed a protective tariff.  They raised it again in 1930 to meet the Great Depression in the United States. But that made the depression worse. The Democrats promised an end to protection, and low rates dominated the debate for the rest of the 20th century.  In 2017 Donald Trump proposed the use of protective tariffs as a means to improve the economy.

See also
 Tariffs
retaliatory tariff
Protectionism
Protectionism in the United States
 World Trade Organization

References

Further reading
Atack, Jeremy, Peter Passell, and Susan Lee. A New Economic View of American History: From Colonial Times to 1940. 2nd ed. New York: Norton, 1994. 125.
Bianco, David. "Trade Barriers." Reference for Business.
Boundless Open Textbook."Protective Tariffs."
Collins English Dictionary - Complete & Unabridged 10th Edition, "protective tariff." HarperCollins Publishers.
"History, Art & Archives, U.S. House of Representatives. "The Tariff of Abominations."
"25 American Products That Rely on Huge Protective Tariffs To Survive." Business Insider, Sept. 2010.
McNamara, Robert. "Definition of Tariff of Abominations." About.com.
Van Duyne. "How a Protective Tariff Works." mrvanduyne.com.

Customs duties
International taxation
International Trade Commission personnel
Protectionism